Maxime Brinck-Croteau (born March 29, 1986) is a male épée fencer from Canada. Brinck-Croteau won the silver medal at the 2015 Pan American Championships in Santiago, and later competed at the 2015 Pan American Games, in Toronto, Ontario.

Brinck-Croteau qualified to represent his country at the 2016 Summer Olympics, by being ranked in the top two in the Americas. He was coached by Paul ApSimon.

References 

 http://olympic.ca/team-canada/maxime-brinck-croteau/

External links
 

Living people
1986 births
Canadian male fencers
People from Amos, Quebec
Sportspeople from Markham, Ontario
Fencers at the 2015 Pan American Games
Olympic fencers of Canada
Fencers at the 2016 Summer Olympics
Pan American Games competitors for Canada